F.C. Arad, Moadon Kaduregel Arad, lit. Football Club Arad (or in short , Mem Kaf Arad, lit. F.C. Arad) was an Israeli football club based in Arad. The club last played in the Liga Gimel South division.

History
The club was founded in 2012, with the purpose of building a new club, which is based on local players from Arad. F.C. Arad joined Liga Gimel South division and played their first match on 28 September 2012, where they were beaten 1–2 by F.C. Rishon LeZion.

After finished their first season at the bottom of their division, and the following season as second bottom, the club's activity was ceased at the summer of 2014, due to financial problems and lack of support from the municipality of Arad. However, after local rivals, Hapoel Arad, were dissolved during the 2014–15 season, and a new mayor was elected in Arad, the club was re-established at the summer of 2015, supported by the municipality.

References

External links
Football Club Arad The Israel Football Association 

Arad
Association football clubs established in 2012
Association football clubs disestablished in 2022
2012 establishments in Israel
2022 disestablishments in Israel